Île-de-France tramway Line 7 (usually called simply T7) is part of the modern tram network of the Île-de-France region of France. Line T7 connects Villejuif – Louis Aragon Paris Métro station in Villejuif and Athis-Mons (Porte de l'Essonne) south of Paris. It also serves Paris Orly Airport. It opened to the public on 16 November 2013.  

Line T7 is operated by the Régie autonome des transports parisiens (RATP) under the authority of Île-de-France Mobilités.

Route

Projects

Extension to Juvisy-sur-Orge 
An extension of Line T7 from its current terminus at Athis-Mons to Juvisy station at Juvisy-sur-Orge is currently at the planning stage.

Notes and references 

Line 7